Tsunenobu Kimoto, from Kyoto University in Japan, was named Fellow of the Institute of Electrical and Electronics Engineers (IEEE) in 2015 for contributions to silicon carbide materials and devices.

References 

Fellow Members of the IEEE
Living people
Year of birth missing (living people)
Academic staff of Kyoto University
Place of birth missing (living people)